Shamiran may refer to:
Semiramis, legendary Assyrian queen
Shamiran, Iran, a village in Mazandaran Province
Shamiran, Kerman, a village in Kerman Province
Shamiram, Armenia, also called Shamiran